Stationsbuurt is a hamlet in the Dutch municipality of Reimerswaal. The hamlet is named after the Rilland-Bath railway station which is the reason for the existence of the hamlet.

References

Populated places in Zeeland
Reimerswaal (municipality)